Stuessy is a surname. Notable people with the surname include:

Dwight Stuessy (1906–1957), American basketball coach
Mel Stuessy (1901–1980), American football player
 (born 1943), American botanist